Vulcanoctopus hydrothermalis  is a small benthic octopus endemic to hydrothermal vents.

It is the only known species of the genus Vulcanoctopus.

Habitat
Vulcanoctopus hydrothermalis lives along the East Pacific Rise, the border of the Pacific, Cocos, and Nazca Plates. It is often found near colonies of giant tube worms.

Description
The morphology of V. hydrothermalis shows some unusual traits for an octopus, due to adaptations selected for in the deep sea, such as the lack of an ink sac. Its dorsal arms are longer than the ventral arms. These feature biserial suckers.

Behavior
The ratio of recovered individuals is skewed towards males, indicating fewer females or spatial segregation by sex. Its primary defense reaction is to freeze in place, then if needed, the secondary defense involves pushing away from the bottom then drifting back down. V. hydrothermalis uses its front arms (I dorsal and II dorsolateral) for feeling its way around and detecting and catching prey, while the back arms (III ventrolateral and IV ventral) support its weight and move the octopus forward. This species has not been observed to use jet propulsion.

Prey
Its confirmed prey consist of the amphipod Halice hesmonectes and crabs, which are thought to be one of their primary food sources.

References

External links
 Vulcanoctopus hydrothermalis at Encyclopedia of Life (pictures)

Enteroctopodidae
Cephalopods of South America
Cephalopods of Oceania
Molluscs of the Pacific Ocean
Molluscs described in 1998